Duolu (Wade–Giles: To-lu; c. 603-651 as a minimum) was a tribal confederation in the Western Turkic Khaganate (c. 581-659). The Turgesh Khaganate (699-766) may have been founded by Duolu remnants.

There existed several Chinese transcriptions 咄陸 (Middle Chinese *tuɑt̚-lɨuk̚ > Mandarin Duōlù), 咄六 (MC. *tuɑt̚-lɨuk̚ > Mand. Duōliù),  都陸 (MC. *tuo-lɨuk̚ > Mand. Dōulù), 都六 (MC. tuo-lɨuk̚ > Mand. Duōliù). The Old Turkic name behind those has been reconstructed, variously and with uncertainty, as *Tör-ok, *Turuk, *Tuğluq, Tölük, Türük, and most recently Tuğluğ (𐱃𐰆𐰍𐰞𐰍) "have flags, have standards".

There is confusion, or possibly connection, with the earlier Onogurs which also means 'ten tribes'. Additionally, Duolu's relation to the Dulo clan of the Bulgars is possible, but not proven.

Initially, Western Turks might have organized themselves into eight tribes, consistent with statements by Syriac and Greek authors: John of Ephesus mentioned eight rulers of the Turks besides Istämi; and Menander Protector mentioned that at Istämi's death, the Western Turkic realm was divided into eight parts. Later on, two Nushibi tribes, Axijie and Geshu, reformed themselves, each sub-divided into two sub-tribes, bringing the total number to ten. Therefore, Western Turks were also called the Onoq or 'ten arrows', that is 'ten tribes', five led the Duolu chors (chuo 啜) and five by the Nushibi  (sijin 俟斤).

They lived between Lake Balkash and the Tian Shan Mountains. Their western neighbor was the Nushibi confederation which extended west to the Syr Darya and southward. The boundary between the two was around the Ili River and the Chu River, that is, near a line running south from the southwest corner of Lake Balkash. The Nushibi had connections southwest with the literate Sogdian merchants. The Duolu were probably more pastoral. Rivers running down from the Tianshan supported agriculture and towns and thus a natural caravan route. The Duolu presumably taxed these people. The West Turkic Khagans had a sort of capital at Suyab near the Duolu-Nushibi boundary.

From at least the time of Heshana Khagan (603) new Khagans were usually supported by either the Duolu or Nushibi faction. In 638 there was a separation of the two factions along the Ili River.

Chinese sources (Old Book of Tang, Tongdian) record of Duolu tribal names & titles:

See also
Duolu Qaghan

Notes

References

Sources
 
 
 
 
 Yuri Bregel, Historical Atlas of Central Asia, 2003, maps 7 and 8, with text.
 
 Tongdian, Vol. 199
 Old Book of Tang, Vol. 194B
 Golden, Peter B., “Oq and Oğur ~ Oğuz”, Turkic Languages, 16/2 (2012). pp. 155–199
 
 
 
 Klyashtorny S.G. (1986). "Genealogiya i khronologiya zapadno-tyurkskikh i tyurgeshskikh kaganov VI–VIII vekov." In Iz istorii dorevolyutsionnogo Kirgizstana. Frunze: Ilim, pp. 164–170. 
 Vladimir Tishin (2018). "Kimäk and Chù-mù-kūn (处木昆): Notes on an Identification"
 Yury Zuev. Horse Tamgas from Vassal Princedoms (Translation of Chinese composition "Tanghuiyao" of 8-10th centuries), Kazakh SSR Academy of Sciences, Alma-Ata, 1960, pp. 93–139 (In Russian)
 Yury Zuev, Early Türks: Sketches of history and ideology, Almaty, Daik-Press, 2002 (in Russian)
 Yury Zuev. The strongest tribe, p. 32-61, Almaty, 2004 (in Russian)

Western Turkic Khaganate
Turkic peoples of Asia
History of Kazakhstan
History of Xinjiang